Gustavo Villagra is a retired Argentinian association football midfielder who played professionally in Argentina, Chile, the United States and Mexico.

In 1991 and 1992, Villagra played for Newell's Old Boys.  In 1995, he was with Inter de Tijuana.  In 1996, Villagra moved to the United States and joined the Rochester Rhinos of the A-League   In June 1996, the Rhinos traded him to the Montreal Impact in exchange for Lenin Steenkamp.  However, he was back with the Rhinos by the time the playoffs began.  Villagra remained with Rochester in 1997 but was released on April 23, 1998.  In 1999, he played for the Staten Island Vipers.  In March 2000, Villagra signed with the Connecticut Wolves, finishing his career with them that season.  He coaches youth soccer in the United States

References

Living people
1970 births
A-League (1995–2004) players
Argentine footballers
Argentine expatriate footballers
Connecticut Wolves players
Inter de Tijuana footballers
Montreal Impact (1992–2011) players
Newell's Old Boys footballers
Rochester New York FC players
Staten Island Vipers players
Association football midfielders
Sportspeople from Jujuy Province